The minister of veterans affairs is the minister of the Crown responsible for the Veterans Affairs Canada, the department of the Government of Canada responsible for administering benefits for members and veterans of the Canadian Armed Forces, the Royal Canadian Mounted Police, and their family members and caregivers. 

Since forming government in 2015, Justin Trudeau has appointed the minister of veterans affairs as associate minister of national defence.

History 
The position was created in the Canadian Cabinet in 1944. The Department of Veterans Affairs was created out of the Department of Pensions and National Health, and was given the responsibility of administering benefits for war veterans. Its first responsibility was assisting in the reintegration of demobilised soldiers into civilian life and assisting them with health care, education, employment, income support, and pensions.

The department is largely responsible for medical care, rehabilitation, and disability pensions and awards for Veterans. Appeals from departmental decisions on disability pensions and awards are presented by Veterans to the Veterans Review and Appeal Board; Veterans Affairs Canada provides Veterans appearing before the Board with the assistance of lawyers from the semi-autonomous Bureau of Pensions Advocates free of charge.

List of ministers

Key:

Prior to 1944, the responsibilities of the current Veterans Affairs portfolio were part of the now-defunct post of Minister of Pensions and National Health.

Military service

Many ministers, all of whom were officers, have had prior military experience. The posting does not, however, require prior military service.

References 

Veterans Affairs
Veterans' affairs in Canada
Canada